Presidential elections were held in the Dominican Republic on 16 May 2004. The result was a victory for former president Leonel Fernández, who defeated incumbent Hipólito Mejía. Voter turnout was 72.8%.

Candidates
Hipólito Mejía, serving president (2000-2004), representing the Dominican Revolutionary Party seeking immediate re-election.
Leonel Fernández, president from 1996-2000, representing the Dominican Liberation Party seeking a second (non-consecutive) term.
Eduardo Estrella of the Social Christian Reformist Party, a former senator and advisor to ex-president Joaquín Balaguer.

Opinion polls in the run-up to election day showed Fernández leading with 54%, Mejía on 27%, and Estrella on 14%. In the previous weeks, however, Mejía had been gaining support while Fernández's numbers had been falling and, as a result, at one point it seemed possible that a second round run-off vote would have to be held between the two top candidates. Fernández's final result, in excess of 50%, meant that the second round was not necessary.

Overseas voting
The Dominican Republic introduced legislation in 1997 to enable Dominican citizens residing abroad to vote in presidential elections. This was the first time the provisions of that law were put into practice, with some 52,500 registered overseas voters eligible to vote at polling stations set up in several American cities including Miami and New York, as well as Montréal, Caracas, Madrid and Barcelona.

Electoral officials noted that 52,500 was only a fraction of the overseas voters actually eligible to vote (one million Dominicans are estimated to live in the United States alone), but that the take-up rate was hampered by a lack of information regarding the necessary formalities and by bureaucratic hurdles (particularly, the requirement that up-to-date national ID cards be presented).

Results

References

Presidential elections in the Dominican Republic
Dominican Republic
Presidential election
Dominican